12th Congress may refer to:

 12th Congress of the League of Communists of Yugoslavia (1982)
 12th Congress of the Philippines (2001–2004)
 12th Congress of the Russian Communist Party (Bolsheviks) (1923)
 12th National Congress of the Chinese Communist Party (1982)
 12th National Congress of the Communist Party of Vietnam (2016)
 12th National Congress of the Kuomintang (1981)
 12th National People's Congress (2013–2018)
 12th United States Congress (1811–1813)